Clewiston High School in Clewiston, Florida is one of two public high schools of the Hendry County Schools system. Clewiston High School, home of the Tigers, is a small, rural school in South Central Florida on the Southern border of Lake Okeechobee.

A small pre-kindergarten program is also operated at this school for the children of current CHS students.

Students
The student body was 51.5% female and 48.5% male in 2013-14. The racial breakdown was:Hispanic-52.0%, Black-23.3%, White-23.3%, Asian/Pacific islanders-0.8
%, Multiracial-0.5% and Native American/Alaskan-0.3%. According to the NCES, 72.2% of the students were eligible for free or reduced lunch.

According to the U.S. News & World Report for the 2009–2010 school year, Clewiston High School is a Title I funds-receiving school, with 63% of its student body considered "economically disadvantaged". Clewiston High School offers Advanced Placement courses, which approximately 30% of its students take. Students also have the opportunity to dual-enroll with Palm Beach State College, Florida SouthWestern State College (formerly Edison State College), or Florida Gulf Coast University. Through this program, all expenses are paid for through the school district. When calculating the letter grade for the schools, dual-enrollment and AP enrollment numbers are included.

Athletics
Clewiston High School offers ten sport programs to their students; these include: Football, Basketball, Track, Cross Country, Soccer, Wrestling, Baseball, Softball, Volleyball, and Golf.
Nine school clubs are also available for students to join.

Notable alumni

Randy Dixon – American football player
Titus Dixon - American football player
Reggie Freeman – American football player
Glenn Glass – American football player
Eric Green – American football player
Alfonso Marshall – American football player
Dan Miller – American football player
Quorey Payne - American football player

References

External links
 Official website

Schools in Hendry County, Florida
Public high schools in Florida